Lettergate, also known as Cable-gate, was a US/Pakistani political affair set off by a conversation at a farewell lunch for the then Pakistani ambassador to the United States Asad Majeed Khan which took place on 7 March 2022 at Khan's official residence, also known as Pakistan House. According to the newspaper Dawn, sources said that although the meeting was a lunch, a note-taker was in attendance. A diplomatic telegram (Cypher No. I-0678) sent by Ambassador Khan to the Ministry of Foreign Affairs was based on the notes taken by the note-taker, who was from the embassy of Pakistan based in Washington, D.C. The lunch was attended by US officials including then US Assistant Secretary of State for South and Central Asian Affairs Donald Lu and Deputy Assistant Secretary Lesslie Viguerie. The Pakistani diplomats attending the lunch meeting included Deputy Chief of Mission Syed Naveed Bokhari and the Defence attaché.

The meeting was deemed a "blatant interference" by the 37th National Security Council of Pakistan and resulted in a strong démarche to the US Chargé d'Affaires. The 38th National Security Council reaffirmed the previous council's assessment, but deemed that "no evidence of any foreign conspiracy" was found. The former Prime Minister of Pakistan, Imran Khan (PTI), alleged that the events of the meeting was an attempt to influence his foreign policy, and the contents of the letter confirmed a conspiracy to remove him from office through a parliamentary vote of no confidence in favor of the members of the Pakistan Democratic Movement. He also alleged that the letter stated that if the vote of no confidence failed, Pakistan would face dire consequences. The US Spokesperson for the Department of State, Ned Price, denied the allegations saying "there is absolutely no truth to that allegation."

On 10 May, the 23rd Prime Minister of Pakistan, Shebaz Shariff (PMLN, PDM), addressed the National Assembly and acknowledged the letter was genuine, but reiterated no conspiracy.

Timeline
 September 2020: The Pakistan Democratic Movement, a political alliance of some opposition parties in Pakistan takes shape against prime minister Imran Khan. 
 2021 end : Opposition seeks to move no confidence motion 
 7 February 2022: Schedule of Prime Minister Imran Khan visit to Russia publicly confirmed in midst of speculation of Russian invasion of Ukraine.
 11 February 2022: Pakistan Democratic Movement (PDM) President Maulana Fazlur Rehman declares the decision of opposition alliance to move a no-confidence motion against the dispensation of Imran Khan by talking to government's allies in the centre for the purpose.
 Unknown date : Foreign Minister Shah Mahmood Qureshi makes (independently not confirmed) claim that the U.S. national security advisor called up his Pakistani counterpart expecting Islamabad to cancel Prime Minister Imran Khan on visit to Russia 
 24 February 2022: Prime Minister Imran Khan on visit to Russia, the day of the invasion of Ukraine took place.
 7 March 2022: US Assistant Secretary of State for South and Central Asian Affairs Donald Lu and Deputy Assistant Secretary Lesslie C Viguerie attend a farewell lunch by Pakistan ambassador Asad Majeed Khan at later's residence. An internal diplomatic cable based on notes from discussions in this lunch by Asad Majeed Khan sent to Pakistan Foreign office.
 27 March 2022: In a speech at Parade Ground in Islamabad, then-Prime Minister Imran Khan removed a document from his pocket and waved it to the crowd and media crew. He claimed that "attempts are being made to influence our foreign policy from abroad. We have been aware of this conspiracy for months". He further stated that "attempts are being made through foreign money to change the government in Pakistan". PM Khan revealed that "we have been threatened in writing but we will not compromise on national interest. The letter I have is proof and I want to dare anyone who is doubting this letter". PM Khan claimed that Nawaz Sharif and Shehbaz Sharif, leaders of the Pakistan Muslim League, and Asif Ali Zardari, president of the Pakistan Peoples Party, were also part of the conspiracy.
 30 March 2022: Islamabad High Court Chief Justice Athar Minallah disposed of a petition that sought a restraining order on PM Khan from disclosing the contents of the confidential letter. The court stated that it "is confident that as an elected prime minister he would not disclose any information or act in breach of Section 5 of the Official Secrets Act, 1923, nor the oath taken by him under the Constitution".
 31 March 2022: Pakistan's National Security Advisor Moeed Yusuf briefed a meeting held by the National Security Committee (NSC) that was chaired by PM Khan. Following which the Prime Minister's Office (PMO) issued a statement saying that "the committee expressed grave concern at the communication, terming the language used by the foreign official as undiplomatic" and called it a "blatant interference in the internal affairs of Pakistan by the country in question". The NSC decided that Pakistan will issue "a strong demarche to the country in question both in Islamabad and in the country's capital through proper channel in keeping with diplomatic norms," according to the PMO statement. Later in the day, the Foreign Office of Pakistan summoned an official of the United States embassy and handed over the requisite demarches.
 3 April 2022:  In a meeting with Ambassador Asad Majeed Khan, PM Khan stated that US Assistant Secretary of State for South and Central Asian Affairs Donald Lu, warned there could be implications if he survived the opposition’s no-confidence motion.
9 April 2022 (night): Imran Khan looses Final vote on no-confidence motion.
 23 April 2022: It was revealed by former SAPM Shebaz Gill that the communication was initially hidden from Prime Minister Khan, and former Minister of Foreign Affairs Shah Mehmood Quereshi. It was not until a "patriotic officer secretly informed Shah Mehmood Quereshi, that the communique was then sent to the Prime Minister who was then advised to remain silent and not talk about it."  The former Minister of Human Rights Shireen Mirazi also confirmed that the letter was hidden from the Prime Minister.
 2 May 2022: Khan asked US president Joe Biden, "by indulging in a regime-change conspiracy to remove a democratically elected PM of a country of over 220 million people in to bring in a puppet prime minister, do you think you have lessened or increased the anti-American sentiment in Pakistan?"
 23 May 2022: Khan suggested that US State Department official Donald Lu be fired for interfering with Pakistan's domestic politics and "for bad manners and sheer arrogance." Khan added, "I had  perfectly good relationship with the Trump administration. It's only when the Biden administration came, and it coincided with what was happening in Afghanistan. And for some reason, which I still don't know, they never got in touch with me."

Contents of the "Letter"
The complete contents of the letter are protected under Section 5 of the Official Secrets Act, 1923 of Pakistan, and have not been disclosed. However, selected components have been spoken about through various interviews, speeches and public statements.

The former Prime Minister Imran Khan and members of his cabinet, claimed that the letter demanded the removal of the Prime Minister and if Khan remained the prime minister, it would lead to horrific consequences.

It also mentioned that all will be forgiven if the Prime Minister was removed.

On 10 May 2022, the Prime Minister of Pakistan, Shehbaz Sharif addressed the National Assembly and acknowledged the letter was threatening, but reaffirmed the notes did not mention conspiracy.

Calls for Judicial Commission and Investigation
On 29 March 2022, the Minister for Planning, Development and Special Initiatives Asad Umar said Prime Minister Khan would share the letter with Chief Justice of Pakistan, Umar Ata Bandial. The PTI government urged the Chief Justice of Pakistan to set up an independent Judicial Commission to investigate the letter. The Chief Justice received the letter however did not comment or form any commission.

The PTI government also turned to retired Lieutenant General Tariq Khan to head a separate commission to investigate the letter.  However the commission failed to form, as Lieutenant General Khan cited the army warned him not to be politicized, and there was not enough time to properly investigate under the current government. In an open letter, Gen. Khan wrote, "I have no connections with any politicians or political party, am known to be apolitical...I was more than willing to undertake this task," however "it appeared that the Government would not last for more than a day or two" so he could not continue.

On 6 May 2022 the newly formed PDM government announced the formation of a probe to investigate the alleged foreign conspiracy. This was rejected in a press conference by former Minister of Information Fawad Chaudry, who reiterated that they "will only consider commission formed under [an] independent judiciary which will have an open hearing." The PTI members "questioned how the FIA, which is under Shehbaz Sharif, can hold a probe into the cypher" and any probe by this government would be biased as they were the beneficiaries of the alleged conspiracy.

The former Prime Minister Khan, in separate letters written to the President of Pakistan and Chief Justice on 30 April 2022, again urged the formation of an independent Judicial Commission.

On 10 May 2022, in a public statement President Arif Alvi verified the contents of the letter, and urged Chief Justice Umar Bandial to hold an open hearing. He "underscored that threats could both be covert and overt and in this particular case, it was clearly communicated through undiplomatic language."

References

2022 in Pakistani politics
2022 controversies
Political scandals in Pakistan
Government of Pakistan secrecy
Imran Khan administration
Pakistan–United States relations